Frank Christopher Stanislaus Anthony is a Guyanese politician. He is the current Minister of Health for the Government of Guyana. Anthony was appointed Minister in August 2020 by President Irfaan Ali.

Biography 
Anthony attended Peoples' Friendship University of Russia where he studied medicine and obtained a Bachelor of Science degree. He also attended Hebrew University where he obtained a Master’s in Public Health degree. Prior to his nomination as minister, Anthony served as Executive Director of the Health Sector Development Unit  Ministry of Health.

References 

Living people
Members of the National Assembly (Guyana)
Peoples' Friendship University of Russia alumni
Hebrew University-Hadassah Braun School of Public Health and Community Medicine alumni
Year of birth missing (living people)
Government ministers of Guyana